In mathematics and numerical analysis, the van Wijngaarden transformation is a variant on the Euler transform used to accelerate the convergence of an alternating series.  

One algorithm to compute Euler's transform runs as follows: Compute a row of partial sums  and form rows of averages between neighbors   The first column  then contains the partial sums of the Euler transform.  

Adriaan van Wijngaarden's contribution was to point out that it is better not to carry this procedure through to the very end, but to stop two-thirds of the way. In many cases the diagonal terms do not converge in one cycle so process of averaging is to be repeated with diagonal terms by bringing them in a row. (For example, this will be needed in a geometric series with ratio .) This process of successive averaging of the average of partial sum can be replaced by using the formula to calculate the diagonal term.  

For a simple-but-concrete example, recall the Leibniz formula for pi   The algorithm described above produces the following table:

These correspond to the following algorithmic outputs:

References

See also
 Euler summation

Mathematical series
Numerical analysis